is a 1970 album released by Hōzan Yamamoto, featuring Western jazz instrumentalists such as bassist Gary Peacock, pianist Masabumi Kikuchi and drummer Hiroshi Murakami. It is an early example of fusion experiments with jazz and Japanese classical music.

Track listing
All compositions by Masabumi Kikuchi

Prologue (序) - 3:10  
Silver World (銀界) - 12:22  
Stone Garden of Ryōan Temple (竜安寺の石庭) - 10:08  
A Heavy Shower (驟雨) - 9:46
Sawanose (沢之瀬) - 11:46  
Epilogue (終) - 2:52

Personnel
Hōzan Yamamoto – shakuhachi flute
Masabumi Kikuchi – piano
Gary Peacock – double-bass
Hiroshi Murakami – drums

1977 albums